
Holy Dormition Pochaiv Lavra, also sometimes known as the Pochaiv Monastery, is a monastery and lavra in Pochaiv, Kremenets Raion, Ternopil Oblast, Ukraine. The monastery belongs to the Ukrainian Orthodox Church. For centuries, it has been the foremost spiritual and ideological centre of various Orthodox and Eastern Catholic denominations in Western Ukraine. The monastery tops a 60-metre hill in the town of Pochayiv, 18 km southwest of Kremenets and 70 km north of Ternopil.

History

Origins 
A first record of the monastery in Pochaiv dates back to 1527, although a local tradition claims that it was established three centuries earlier, during the Mongol invasion, by several runaway monks, either from the Kyiv Monastery of the Caves or from the Holy Mount Athos. The legend has it that the Theotokos appeared to the monks in the shape of a column of fire, leaving her footprint in the rock she stood upon. This imprint came to be revered by the local population and brethren for the curative, medicinal properties of the water that issued from it.

In the 16th century, the abbey was prosperous enough to commission a stone cathedral and to host a busy annual fair. Its standing was further augmented in 1597, when a noble lady, Anna Hoyska, presented to the monastery her extensive lands and a miracle-working icon of the Theotokos. This image, traditionally known as Our Lady of Pochayiv, was given to Hojska by a passer-by Bulgarian bishop, and helped to cure her brother from blindness.

St Job of Pochaiv

In 1604, the monastic community was joined by Ivan Zalizo, a well-known champion of Eastern Orthodoxy in union with the then newly recognised Muscovite patriarchate Russian Orthodox Church and was a vocal critic of the Union of Brest. Formerly associated with the printing house of Prince Ostrogski, Zalizo established a press in Pochayiv in 1630, which supplied all of Galicia and Volhynia with Ruthenians Orthodox theological literature. The press continued to function until 1924, when it was taken first to Czechoslovakia, then to Munich, and then, in 1946, to the Holy Trinity Monastery in Jordanville, New York.

Zalizo received the monastic name of Job and was elected the monastery's hegumen. Job introduced strict discipline and other reforms of monastic life. During his time in office, the monastery had to fend off incessant attacks by Hoyska's heirs, notably Andrzej Firlej, Castellan of Belz, who sued the monks over his grandmother's bequest. In 1623, Firlej raided the monastery, taking the holy icon with him and keeping it until 1641, when a court decision finally returned the icon to the monks. Job of Pochayiv died on 25 October 1651 and was glorified as a saint soon thereafter.

In union with Rome

During the Zbarazh War of 1675, the cloister was besieged by the Turkish Army, who reputedly fled upon seeing the apparition of the Theotokos accompanied with angels and St Job. Numerous Turkish Muslims that witnessed the event during the siege converted to Christianity afterward. One of the monastery chapels commemorates this event.

According to some sources, Feofan Prokopovich, a Ruthenian reformer of the Russian Orthodox Church, took monastic vows in Pochayiv; he subsequently visited the monastery with his sovereign, Peter the Great, in 1712.

After 1720, when the monastery was given to Greek Catholic Basilian monks. The process was reversed due to a seemingly miraculous occurrence. In 1759, a coach of Count Mikołaj Bazyli Potocki capsized near the monastery walls. In a fit of anger, Potocki fired at his driver three times, all without avail. Attributing this failure to the divine intercession, Potocki settled in Pochayiv and started to lavish gifts upon the cloister.

In 1773, Potocki (who was originally a Roman Catholic, and later became Greco-Catholic) petitioned the Pope to recognize the Pochayiv icon as miraculous and St Job as a Catholic saint. Only the former petition was accepted. Upon Potocki's death in 1782, he was interred at the Assumption Cathedral whose construction he had subsidized.

Between Poland and Russia

In 1795 in result of the Third Partition of Poland, Volhynia became a part of the Russian Empire. Although a reversion of Greek Catholics to Russian Orthodoxy began, the Russian Imperial authorities did not immediately push this to confiscate the property of those who chose not to do so. Moreover, the typography and religious schools in the monastery continued to use Latin whilst the main language of communication was Polish. Nevertheless, the first Russophilic tendencies demonstrated themselves at that time. Within thirty years of the division of Poland, the Orthodox Bishop of Volhynia, Stephan wrote to Emperor Alexander I seeking to have the Pochayiv Monastery turned over to the Russian Orthodox Church in 1823, but his request was initially overruled. However it was only nine years later, in 1831, after the Greek-Catholic support for the November Uprising, that Nicholas I of Russia ordered the cloister be given to the adherents of the Russian Orthodox Church; the monastery was reconsecrated as an Orthodox entity under the communion of the Moscovite Patriarchy on 10 October of that year (thereby ending 110 years of Greek-Catholic monastic life).

Two years later, in 1833, the Russian Church accorded the status of lavra upon the monastery, even though it had been a lavra during the time of the Basilians. It also beacem the summer residence for the Russian Orthodox bishops of Volhynia. Towards the end of the 19th century, Pochayiv became a mecca of Orthodox pilgrims from across the Russian empire and the Balkans. Its politically symbolic image as a western forepost of imperial Orthodoxy (being only several kilometres from the Greek-Catholics in Austrian-ruled Galicia) was widely used in propagating Pan-slavism.

During the first days of World War I, thousands of Galician Ukrainians paid pilgrimage to the Lavra and some converted to Russian Orthodoxy, after the Russian imperial forces had swept over much of Galicia Battle of Galicia - some of the Slav elements in the Austro-Hungarian armies surrendering to the Russians (cf. Russian occupation of Eastern Galicia, 1914–1915). In 1915 the Lavra, along with the whole of Volhynia, became a front-line between Austria and Russia Great Retreat (Russian). However the looting by the Austrians in 1915 was just the start of its long journey into the 20th century.

After the Russian October Revolution of 1917, another looting by Bolsheviks, the short-lived Ukrainian movements, and the Polish–Soviet War in 1920, western Volhynia was transferred to Poland under the terms of the Peace of Riga. In 1921 the Lavra found itself on a crisis state with little food and much physical damage caused by nearly a decade of unrest. The most worrying factor for the monks however, was the ecclesiastical link to whom it should submit. Like most Russian Orthodox communities that found themselves outside the USSR, and thus outside any possible ecclesiastical control from the persecuted Russian Orthodox Church, the Ecumenical Patriarchate of Constantinople agreed to take over Moscow's role and the Lavra became part of the Polish Orthodox Church in 1923.

Until the end of the 1920s the Lavra was a peaceful place and repaired many of its damaged buildings. It was the first complete monastery to have its own electricity. In 1929 after the Polish Republican decree on the protection of Ruthenians ceased the Roman Catholic Church immediately began to exploit this. The Lavra received more than a hundred accusations against it and demanding the Orthodox to transfer the cloister. Despite numerous allegations, the Lavra survived them all and in process once again became the most visible Orthodox centre in the Second Polish Republic.

Recent history
Pochayiv Lavra had an indirect influence on Orthodoxy in the West. Archimandrite Vitaly (Maximenko), the director of the monastery’s printshop, evacuated the monastery’s printshop following the Russian Revolution. He then fled to Czechoslovakia, where he started a new brotherhood and resumed publishing. This new St. Job of Pochaev Brotherhood moved from Czechoslovakia to Germany and eventually America, where it joined the Holy Trinity Monastery near Jordanville, New York, with now-Archbishop Vitaly becoming its abbot. Holy Trinity Monastery thus carried on the publishing legacy of St. Job of Pochaev.

In 1939, under the terms of Molotov-Ribbentrop Pact's Secret protocol, Western Volhynia was annexed into the Ukrainian SSR. Part of the local population viewed it, at least initially, as a form of liberation from Polish rule. However the Soviet governments' anti-religious stance became the new source of oppression, although the Ukrainian form of this persecution was somewhat less rigid than in that of the Russian lands in the early 1920s. The Lavra self-transferred to the Moscow Patriarchy, during this time thousands of Orthodox pilgrims, from all over the USSR, at their own risk, took the chance to pay a visit to the cloister that they feared would share the fate that of all others in the USSR. It was not to be, although the Lavra was thoroughly searched, the monastic livestock, orphanage and other communal services which it provided to the local community were promptly confiscated, the sheer numbers of visitors prevented the Soviets taking immediate action against a place that once again had become a refuge for Orthodoxy.

When Nazi Germany invaded the USSR on 22 June 1941, the Germans did not close the Lavra, but they did confiscate all that the Soviets could not get their hands on. During this time the Ukrainian Autocephalous Orthodox Church was formed. The Germans supported that church and forcefully transferred some of the Orthodox property to it. However, the Pochayiv Lavra refused to follow, what it called, a schism. Instead, in 1941 it became the center of the "Autonomist" movement, which claimed jurisdictional subordination to Moscow while at the same time being free to act independently of Moscow so long as the Moscow Patriarch was under Soviet control. During the WWII the Soviet policy toward religion completely seemingly changed. Reestablishing the patriarchy, the Russian Orthodox church (MP) took a strong pro-soviet position against the Nazis and participated in the resistance on territories under Nazis. Whilst being a very visible centre of Orthodoxy prevented the Lavra taking such an active role as it potentially could, nevertheless it did provide refuge to the local population from Nazi persecution. In August 1944 the Red Army liberated Volhynia and this time the soldiers bowed to its mighty walls.

Following the war, the Lavra was situated on a territory which contained the largest concentration of Orthodox parishes in the USSR. Its position of a forepost of state-sponsored Russian Orthodoxy in western Ukraine was even more reinforced in 1948 after the Soviet state-organised Synod of Lviv, which terminated the Union of Brest and forcibly disbanded Greek Catholicism in Eastern Galicia by converting them to Russian Orthodoxy. However the post-war permissive attitude towards religion in the Soviet Union promptly ended with the new Thaw policy of Nikita Khrushchev in the late 1950s. During this time the Lavra came under extensive pressure from the Soviet government, subjected to regular raids and searches as well as constant monitoring. A museum of atheism was opened in one of the confiscated church buildings in 1959. Yet despite this pressure the Lavra survived closure, and by the end of the 1970s was the main theological centre of Moscow Patriarchy's Ukrainian Exarchate in the Russian Orthodox Church.

In the late 1980s, after the Soviet Union relaxed its restrictions on religion, the former Museum of Atheism was closed and was first turned into a theological school, which in turn became a seminary in 1991. Also at the same time the Byzantine Church, in Union with the Holy See of Rome, now the Ukrainian Greek Catholic Church, was revived, as was the Ukrainian Autocephalous Orthodox Church. The Lavra's community unanimously declined any sympathy to these newly restored communions, attributing their action partly to some of the more violent methods that were employed, aided by nationalist paramilitaries, against the parishes of Moscow's Russian Orthodox Church. In opposition a pro-Moscovite Cossack regiment was formed to safeguard Russian Orthodox parishes. Because the Lavra's rerise from Soviet persecution coincided with these events, its politico-historical position as a forepost of state-supported Moscovite Russian Orthodoxy in Western Ukraine was once again unveiled. Its militant Cossacks prevented seizure of Orthodox communities in Volhynia and in Ukraine by the Greek Catholic or Ukrainian Kyiv Patriarchate jurisdictions (the ambiguous position of Greek Catholic churches and property seized for the Muscovite Russian Orthodoxy remained unsettled.

In April 2015, deputies of the Ternopil regional council voted for transfer of the Holy Dormition Pochayiv Lavra to the state.

Saint Amphilochius of Pochayiv

On 12 May 2002, the Ukrainian Orthodox Church canonized schema monk Amphilochius (Amfilohiy) of Pochayiv. Amphilochius of Pochayiv (in world Yakiv Holovatyuk 1894 - 1971) was born on 27 November 1894 in the village Mala Ilovytsya, in Shumsk raion of Ternopil Oblast in western Ukraine. In 1925 he became a monk and joined the community of Pochayiv Lavra. In 1936, Amphilochius had been given the rank of hieromonk (priest-monk). His healing gifts attracted the attention of many people. Archimandrite of Lavra blessed the monk in this work and allowed him to settle in a little hut near the cemetery. In the summers, the pilgrimage to Amphilochius (then called father Joseph) was increasing, reaching 500 people daily. On the 11 / 12 May 2002, he was canonized by the Orthodox Church after the church commission researched his life. Just before Easter his relics were uncovered fully intact. Over 20,000 Orthodox pilgrims arrived to take part in the veneration of Saint Amphilochius. Many healings took place when people come to touch his relics.

Since independence the Lavra has made many efforts to become the second Orthodox centre in Ukraine, after the Kyiv Monastery of the Caves. The first alumni from its seminary have by now gained bishop rank. The literature that is published and the icons on its walls can be found all over Ukraine, and outside in neighboring Russia and Belarus. Millions of Orthodox pilgrims visit the ancient cloister from all over the former USSR, the Balkans, and more distant Orthodox places.

Buildings 

The lavra is dominated by the Dormition Cathedral, conceived by Nicholas Potocki as the largest of Greek-Catholic churches and constructed between 1771 and 1783 to designs by the German architect Gottfried Hoffmann. The exterior of the cathedral, with two lofty towers flanking the façade, is rigorously formulated in the style transitional between baroque and neoclassicism. Several subsidiary structures, notably a winter chapel from 1862 and a refectory from 1888, adjoin the main church.

After the Greek-Catholic clergy reverted to Orthodoxy, the rich and refined interior of the cathedral had to be completely renovated in order to conform to traditional Orthodox requirements. After a fire in 1874 the internal artworks were repainted by the academic Vasilyev and also participating was a sculptor Poliyevsky. The cathedral contains the tomb of Nicholas Potocki and two greatest shrines of Pochayiv - the footprint and the icon of the Theotokos.

To the southeast of the Assumption Cathedral stands the 65-metre bell tower, one of the tallest in Ukraine, erected in four levels between 1861 and 1869. Its largest bell, cast in 1886, weighs 11,5 tonnes.

Nearby is the Trinity Cathedral, constructed between 1906 and 1912 to a revivalist design by Aleksey Schusev. The cathedral's austere exterior is based on medieval Northern Russian architecture, while the porches feature Symbolist mosaics and paintings by Nicholas Roerich.

The cave churches of St Job and of Sts Anthony and Theodosius are situated for the most part beneath the ground. Their construction started in 1774 and was carried on in several stages, the last in 1860. The church of St Job contains a famous gift from Countess Orlova, a silver reliquary with relics of that saint.

More recent constructions include two chapels, one to mark the 400th anniversary of the transfer of the beholied icon of Theotokos by Anna Hoiskaja, was completed in 1997. Another chapel, to honour the second millennia since the birth of Christ, was built in 2000.

See also
USSR Anti-Religious Campaign (1958–1964)

Notes

References
Ambrosius, Hegumen of Pochaev. Tales about Pochaev Assumption Lavra. Pochaev, 1878.
V.P. Andriyivsky. On Pochayivska Lavra. Kyiv, 1960.
Monasteries of the Russian Orthodox Church. Moscow, 2000.

External links

Official website of the Pochayiv Lavra
Pochaiv Monastery in Encyclopedia of Ukraine
Pochaiv Lavra Choir Music for listening, text in Russian

Eastern Orthodox monasteries in Ukraine
Eastern Orthodox church buildings in Ukraine
Monasteries of the Ukrainian Orthodox Church (Moscow Patriarchate)
Marian apparitions
Shrines to the Virgin Mary
Polish Eastern Catholics
Pochaiv
Lavras